Bruzgi or Bruzhi (() is a village in Belarus located in the Odelsk Rural Settlement in Grodno District which is part of Grodno Region, very close to the Belarus-Poland border. Near the village is the Kuźnica-Bruzgi border crossing. Klachki and Trubka are two villages nearby.

History
Between 1940 and 1959 the village was the administrative center of Bruzhinsky Selsoviet. Until 2002 it was part of Padlabiennie Selsoviet.

2020s 

In 2021, refugees, primarily Iraqi, entered the vicinity of Bruzgi, intending to depart from there to cross the Polish Border at Kuźnica. In response, the Polish government declared a state of emergency, stationing over 12,000 troops at the border. Politicians from Poland and the European Union accused Belarusian President Alexander Lukashenko of using the migrants as a form of "hybrid warfare" to destabilize Poland and other EU member countries.

References

Villages in Belarus
Białystok Voivodeship (1919–1939)
Belastok Region
Belarus–Poland border crossings
Populated places in Grodno Region